Matshelagabedi is a town in eastern Botswana, 17 kilometers from Francistown with a population of 3,488 in 2011: 1,706 males and 1,782 females. The town is hometown to retired middle-distance runner Glody Dube.

In 2002, there was a foot-and-mouth disease outbreak in Matshelagabedi, along with three other villages. No more than 12,000 cattle died in the Matshelagabedi area. The government compensated farmers with cash and animals, and instituted a relief work program.

The Botswana Power Corporation has an emergency diesel plant of 70MW in Matshelagabedi.

References 

Populated places in Botswana